The Call of Duty League (CDL) is a professional esports league for the video game series Call of Duty, produced by its publisher Activision. The Call of Duty League follows the model of the Overwatch League as well as other traditional North American professional sporting leagues by using a set of permanent, city-based teams backed by separate ownership groups. In addition, the league plays in a tournament point system and playoffs format rather than the use of promotion and relegation used commonly in other esports and non-North American leagues, with players on the roster being assured a minimum annual salary, benefits, and a portion of winnings and revenue-sharing based on how that team performs. The League was announced in 2019 with its inaugural season starting in 2020.

Format 
The Call of Duty League is owned by Activision Blizzard and is the company's second franchise-based esports league. The league plays out similar to most North American professional sports leagues, in which all teams play scheduled games against other teams to vie for position in the season's playoffs, rather than the approach of team promotion and relegation more commonly used in other esports leagues. The league currently features twelve teams.

Each match between two teams consists of a best-of-five through different games based on gameplay modes and maps within the Call of Duty game. The inaugural season used the 2019 release, Call of Duty: Modern Warfare, played on standard PlayStation 4 consoles and other equivalent equipment for all players. The three multiplayer modes used by the CDL include: "Search & Destroy", where one team attempts to plant a bomb and defend it at one of two control points while the other team tries to eliminate the bomb team, or if the bomb is activated, to defuse it in time; "Hardpoint", where a rotation control point appears on the map, and teams earn points for maintaining control on that point; and "Domination", where three control points appear on the map, and teams are awarded points by maintaining control of one or more of these points. In the case of "Search & Destroy" and "Domination", multiple rounds are played, switching the role of each team, while "Hardpoint" is played until a point limit is reached. Once a team has won three games in a match, the match is over, and that team given the match victory. Coaches for teams have a limited number of time outs which they can use during a game, and can substitute players during this time; this is in contrast to the OWL format where play substitutions may only occur between games.

The 2020 season schedule is evenly divided into two splits for spring and summer, with a mid-season all-star event taking place after the spring split, and culminates in the Championship Weekend. Each team will host a weekend tournament-style event in their home city, and the top teams from the weekend earns points. The top eight teams at the end of season based on points claim a berth in the playoffs. A total  prize pool is available to teams in the inaugural season. To standardize play at each homestand weekend, Activision constructed a transportable esports stage with input from each of the teams. To support viewership, Activision studios Infinity Ward and Beenox created a server architecture for the Call of Duty games, the CODCaster, that enables a match to be viewed from multiple different angles and identify which angles have the most exciting action to follow, as to allow the commentators and producers of the broadcast events to help show key action in the match. CODCaster also compiles key in-game statistics, and is able to render the team's characters in their team's colors for the viewing audience, though players themselves will not have this benefit.

Each team must have a minimum of seven players with a maximum of ten. Players are guaranteed a minimum  salary with health and other benefits, though players may negotiate for higher salaries. At least 50% of the winnings a team earns must be shared with the team members. Players are not required to live in the city/region that the team represents. Teams are not required to providing housing for players during the season, and if they do not choose to offer it, the team must instead offer a means and stipend to help players to find such housing with approval from Activision.

Activision also established a Call of Duty Challengers series for amateur players to compete in matches and potentially be played into teams that vie for a prize pool alongside the main League season. This provides the League teams with a pool of talent that they can draw from for their teams.

Changes for the 2021 season 
The 2021 season will be played on the 2020 release, Call of Duty: Black Ops Cold War, played on PC, using any league approved controller. This season competitive Call of Duty will make the switch back to 4v4, after two seasons on 5v5. The three modes used this season will include: "Search & Destroy"; "Hardpoint"; and "Control", where one team attempts to capture two points on the map, while the other team defends them. The round can end with the attackers capturing both zones within the allotted time, the defenders winning by the time expiring or by either team killing the other thirty times.

The 2021 season schedule is split into five stages, with each ending with a Major Tournament. In each stage the teams will be split into groups, determined by the teams themselves, via a draft system. Every team will complete in each homestand event with the finals of each event being a meeting between teams from the opposite group. During each homestand teams will earn CDL points and the top eight teams at the end of the season will enter the playoffs to compete for the CDL Championship.

Call of Duty Challengers 
Challengers is the amateur division of competitive Call of Duty. Challengers contains all of the up-and-coming players that are striving to enter the official Call of Duty League. The 2020 Challengers season offered a massive prize pool of $1,000,000 to be given out through a series of tournaments. The Challengers division is run through a format of "Pro points" or "Challenger points" which are virtual points given out to people based on their placing in tournaments. Owing to the vast number of people trying to make it to the Call of Duty League, it would be very difficult to find the best players without the addition of these points. This allows for franchised teams such as Optic Gaming or Seattle Surge to have academy teams equipped with the best players in Challengers. This allow for greater branding and the players based on the placing of their academy teams.

The events for Challengers are held offline in special locations. The dates of these events is in accordance to the actual Call of Duty League events. The first event of Modern Warfare was the Minnesota Launch Weekend event where there were professional pro league matches being played as well as Challengers events being held. However, before the first LAN (Local Area Network) event during that weekend. Challengers players have to play in two online ladder tournaments to compete for Challengers points. This points are individual to each person and the sum of those points in accordance to everyone else on the team decides the seeding for the LAN events at home series events. However, in the middle of the 2020 season and beginning in the 2021 season, Challengers will be played in an online format due to the COVID-19 virus. This has changed the format to where players will play in a "Cup" or tournament every weekend in order to compete for prizes and pro points. On top of the cups, the home series events will also be played online as compared to when they were played on LAN in the beginning of the MW season.

International representation 
Call of Duty is an international game, even though the North American challengers are the most widely watched. There are several different regions that follow the same format as the Challengers Circuit. There are the regions of APAC, South America, and Europe. There is a large representation of international countries within the CDL. There are several teams within the actual CDL that have players from the international regions. There are even teams from London and Paris to represent these players and places. In terms of players, there is also a representation for them. Players like Hydra, Skrapz, Afro, Bance, Cammy, and Dylan are all players that made their way through the international Challengers or amateur circuit in order to enter the pro league and eventually transfer over to the CDL. Recently, the EU, APAC, and South America Challengers were introduced. There are dedicated streams for each region in partnership with YouTube Gaming. The greatest achievement out of all 3 regions dates back to the Black Ops 4 Pro League season where Team Heretics which consisted of a full South American team qualified for the Pro League which brought over much viewership from South America and helped the league grow.

League advertising and viewership 
Activision Blizzard, the publishers of the Call of Duty series launched the Call of Duty League and focused on a plan to try to make the league as presentable as possible. They first started the league by announcing a partnership with Google to allow YouTube Gaming to have exclusive streaming rights for all of their leagues. This was a major announcement as this was the major way that spectators would be able to watch the league from home. This was especially advantageous when the CDL went to online only due to the COVID-19 virus. The growth of the league coincides with the growth of Activision Blizzard. In comparison to the Overwatch League, the CDL has made a lot more revenue and has reached a larger audience due to several aspects. The Overwatch League which is Activision Blizzard's other franchised league, did not report any substantial or revenue growth for the game itself as well as for the league. As compared to the CDL, which is based on the legendary gaming franchise Call of Duty. Even for the 2020 CDL Modern Warfare season, the game ended up being the top-selling game of the year with 172 million downloads and $87 million in global consumer spending in the first two months of release.

Viewership records 

 The overall growth of the league since the first season has been significant. The opening weekend of the 2021 CDL season was up 50% over the 2020 season at 131,000 viewers at its peak.
 The average viewership of the league in the 2021 season was 118,000 as calculated from the highly anticipated match of Optic Chicago vs Atlanta Faze.
 The whole weekend of matches was kept at a high 80,000 viewers which shows how it was the most watches CDL event since the 2020 CDL Championship.
 The overall average viewership and total hours watched increased by 50% in the 2021 CDL season .
 1.3 million unique viewers tuned in to watch the opening weekend of the 2021 CDL season which was an increase of over 70% over the 2020 Opening Weekend.

History 
In February 2019, Activision Blizzard officially confirmed their intention to launch a city-based, franchised league for Call of Duty, marking their second such organization following the Overwatch League, founded in 2017. To prepare for establishing the League, Activision terminated both the Call of Duty Pro League and Call of Duty World League in mid-2019.

The first five teams to purchase a spot for the league was announced in May 2019; the companies – OverActive Media, Atlanta Esports Ventures, Envy Gaming, c0ntact Gaming LLC, and Sterling.VC – were also parent companies for teams in Activision Blizzard's other franchised league, the Overwatch League. All twelve franchises were finalized in October 2019, with a majority of the franchised having never professionally competed in Call of Duty.

Initially, the CDL announced that they would be running a regular season format culminating in postseason playoffs. However, after criticism from the Call of Duty esports community, the league elected to switch to a tournament system, which was officially announced in January 2020.

In the days prior to the launch of the inaugural season, Activision announced it had made a multiyear deal with Google for all of its esports content, including the CDL, to be exclusively shown through YouTube. Prior Activision esports, particularly OWL, had used Twitch. Activision also announced other official sponsors of the league on eve of the first season: On March 9, Activision announced partnerships with both Twitter and the United States Army.

PlayStation 4 as the official platform of the CDL and an official partner of the Call of Duty Challengers League.
Mountain Dew Amp Game Fuel as the official beverage of the CDL through to the 2022 season.
Astro Gaming as the official Headset and MixAmp provider through to the 2022 season.
SCUF Gaming as the official controller of the Call of Duty League through to the 2021 season.
United States Air Force will create on site opportunities for fans to experience flight simulators and other military activities on a one-year deal.
United States Army as the presenting sponsor of Call of Duty Collegiate and to offer activities alongside the Air Force on site.
Twitter as "the source for Call of Duty League highlights and community engagement."
Sony Xperia as the official mobile partner of the Call of Duty League.

Effects of the COVID-19 pandemic 

On March 13, 2020, the Call of Duty League released a statement entailing that all live home series events were cancelled due to concerns over the novel COVID-19 Coronavirus outbreak, to which they said that upcoming events will be done via online play and possibly return to live events if logistically and feasibly possible. On May 19, 2020, the Call of Duty League announced changes to the 2020 Call of Duty League Championship. Instead of 8 teams making it to the Championship weekend all 12 teams would now compete for the Championship in a double-elimination tournament. A  prize pool was announced, with the winning team taking home .

On July 5, 2020, the Call of Duty league announced that the postseason would also be played online as a result of the pandemic. Additional measures to further protect the competitive integrity of the league were also announced. All competitors are to be provided with a universal camera which will need to be activated throughout all matches with the camera providing league officials visibility each competitor's console, controller and monitor.

Teams 
The Call of Duty League follows the model of the Overwatch League as well as other traditional North American professional sporting leagues by using a set of permanent, city-based teams backed by separate ownership groups. The CDL launched in January 2020 with twelve teams, each based in a global city. Of the twelve teams, nine are based in the United States, while the remaining three are based in Canada, the United Kingdom, and France.

On November 6, 2020, 100 Thieves announced that they would join the league under the name of the Los Angeles Thieves after acquiring OpTic Gaming Los Angeles slot. For the 2021 season, the Chicago Huntsmen rebranded to OpTic Chicago, as Hector ‘H3CZ’ Rodriguez reacquired the OpTic Gaming brand.

Following the 2021 season, OpTic Gaming and Envy Gaming announced a merger, causing the former Chicago spot to be put up for sale, which the Kraft Group later acquired. With this, the Boston Breach was announced as the new team heading into the 2022 season.

On June 1, 2022, Paris Legion announced that following the 2022 season, the team would be relocating to Las Vegas for the 2023 season.

Current teams

League Championships 
As of the 2022 season, 14 different teams have competed in the league, with three having won at least one Grand Finals title.

Stage Titles 
This is a list of each team by stage titles won. Stage titles are won by being the champion of the major at the end of the stage. Stage titles started with the 2021 season.

Seasons

2020

The regular season began January 24 and continued through July 2020, with a two-week post season playoffs to crown the season winners in August. Teams were due to hold in person tournaments in their respective cities with a rotation of eight of the 12 teams in attendance for each event. However, due to the COVID-19 pandemic only 3 homestand style events were held, with team owners and players voting to have the league move online for the remainder of the season.  The Grand Finals were held online, on August 30, in which the regular season number 2 seed Dallas Empire defeated the regular season number 1 seed Atlanta FaZe 5–1 to become the first Call of Duty League champions.

2021 

The 2021 season had a similar structure to the previous season. However, some things changed and updated since the last season. This season had several stages where teams were randomly picked and put into groups to play each other in official matches for CDL points which dictated the seeds for the teams in the CDL major events when they happened. The CDL points decide if a team starts in the losers or winners bracket at the start of the tournament. To start off the 2021 season group selections, the 2020 CDL champions Dallas Empire will made the first pick of the teams they want in their group and the runner up at the 2020 CDL championships Atlanta Faze made the 2nd pick. There was a snake draft between those two teams until all teams were put into a group. In addition, the top two finishing teams in stage 1 were then the two teams for group selection in stage 2. The 2021 season consisted of 5 stages until the CDL playoffs which is the biggest tournament with the biggest prize pool.

2022

2023

Notes

References

External links
 

 
Esports competitions in the United States
2019 establishments in the United States